Haras El-Hodood Stadium (Border Guard Stadium) is a multi-purpose stadium in Alexandria, Egypt. It is used mostly for football matches, and was used for the 2006 African Cup of Nations. The stadium holds 22,000 people. The pitch is surrounded by an athletics track,  rectangular in shape & therefore having 90 degrees corners, rather than the conventional curve. The stadium is home to Haras El-Hodood and El Raja Marsa Matruh.

See also
 Alexandria Stadium
 Borg El Arab Stadium
 Sports in Alexandria

Football venues in Egypt
Multi-purpose stadiums in Egypt
Sports venues in Alexandria